A Scent of the Matterhorn is a 1961 Warner Bros. Looney Tunes cartoon written and directed by Chuck Jones (credited as M. Charl Jones). The short was released on June 24, 1961, and stars Pepé Le Pew.

The title is a play on the phrase "ascent of the Matterhorn."

Plot

References

External links 
 

1961 films
1961 animated films
1961 short films
Looney Tunes shorts
Warner Bros. Cartoons animated short films
Short films directed by Chuck Jones
Pepé Le Pew films
Animated films about cats
Films set in the Alps
Films scored by Milt Franklyn
1960s Warner Bros. animated short films
1960s English-language films